Hannington Mutebi is an Anglican bishop who serves in Uganda: since 2014 he has been Assistant Bishop of Kampala

He was appointed Chancellor of Ndejje University on December 17th 2021 at the 23rd Graduation Ceremony.

References

21st-century Anglican bishops in Uganda
Anglican bishops of Kampala
Uganda Christian University alumni
Year of birth missing (living people)
Living people